Lord Torphichen or Baron Torphichen is a title in the Peerage of Scotland. It was created by Queen Mary in 1564 for Sir James Sandilands (to whom she was related), with remainder to his heirs and assigns whatsoever.

The first Baron Sandilands had previously served as Preceptor of the Order of St John of Jerusalem, of Rhodes, and of Malta in Scotland, and took the title from the Torphichen Preceptory in West Lothian.  He was succeeded by his great-nephew James Sandilands (who was also the current feudal baron of Calder). Thereafter the Lordship of Parliament of Torphichen and the Feudal Barony of Calder were conjoined, and all later lords were descended from the second Lord Torphichen. His great-grandson, the seventh Lord, was a strong supporter of the union with England.  His grandson, the ninth Lord, and great-great-grandson, the 12th Lord, sat in the House of Lords as Scottish Representative Peers. , the title is held by the latter's great-grandson, the 15th Lord, who succeeded his father in 1975. He is Chief of Clan Sandilands and also holds the feudal title of Baron of Calder, granted in 1386.

Torphichen, is pronounced 'Tor-fikken'.

The family seat  is Calder House, near Mid Calder, West Lothian.

Lords Torphichen (1564)
James Sandilands, 1st Lord Torphichen (c. 1511–1579), succeeded by his elder brother's grandson
James Sandilands, 2nd Lord Torphichen (c. 1574–1617)
James Sandilands, 3rd Lord Torphichen (c. 1597–1622)
John Sandilands, 4th Lord Torphichen (c. 1598–1637), brother of third Lord
John Sandilands, 5th Lord Torphichen (1625–1649), died unmarried
Walter Sandilands, 6th Lord Torphichen (1629–1696), brother of fifth Lord, m. Anne Elphinstone, daughter of Alexander, 6th Lord Elphinstone
James Sandilands, 7th Lord Torphichen (d. 1753), married Lady Jean Hume, daughter of Patrick, Earl of Marchmont 
Walter Sandilands, 8th Lord Torphichen (1707–1765)
James Sandilands, 9th Lord Torphichen (1759–1815)
James Sandilands, 10th Lord Torphichen (1770–1862)
Robert Sandilands, 11th Lord Torphichen (1807– 24 December 1869), nephew of 10th Lord Torphichen
James Walter Sandilands, 12th Lord Torphichen (1846–1915)
John Gordon Sandilands, 13th Lord Torphichen (1886–1973)
James Bruce Sandilands, 14th Lord Torphichen (1917–1975)
James Andrew Douglas Sandilands, 15th Lord Torphichen (b. 1946)

The heir presumptive is the present holder's first cousin twice removed Robert Powell Sandilands  (b. 1950).
The heir presumptive's heir apparent is his only son Ashton Powell Sandilands (b. 1979).

Arms

See also
Clan Sandilands
Torphichen Preceptory

References

External links
Torphichen Website

Lordships of Parliament
Noble titles created in 1564